Special Assignment may refer to:

SABC Special Assignment, a South African current affairs TV programme
"Special Assignment" (Captain Scarlet), an episode of the British TV series Captain Scarlet and the Mysterons
Special Assignment (TV series), a Canadian current affairs TV series
Special Assignments, a novella collection by Russian author Boris Akunin